is a collective term for Japanese traditional techniques for the use of armour, blades, firearms, and techniques related to combat and horse riding. The kanji 古流武術 (old-school martial arts) and 古武術 (old martial arts) are other ways of writing it. The general umbrella term  is also used to describe these ancient arts.

Definition and features 
Kobudō (古武道) can be translated as 古 (old) 武 (martial) 道 (way) "old martial art"; the term appeared in the first half of the seventeenth century. Kobudō marks the beginning of the Tokugawa period (1603–1868) also called the Edo period, when total power was consolidated by the ruling Tokugawa clan. The term often refers to martial arts established before the Meiji Restoration of the 19th century. Since the Muromachi period, swordsmanship, jūjutsu, martial arts, archery, artillery, etc. have been technicalized and systematized as various schools. The term Kobudō (古武道, ancient martial arts) contrasts with Gendai budō ("modern martial arts") or shinbudō ("new martial arts") which refer to schools developed since the Meiji era.

Whereas modern martial arts are designed to develop human skills and physical and mental training from the physical point of view, focusing on sports-related competitions and constructing technical systems (e.g., jūdō and kendō), old martial arts are fundamentally not intended with an outcome of a winning match. Training was for the sake of it. Dangerous techniques that are excluded from modern martial arts include various hidden weapons, medicinal methods, and magic. Old martial arts are linked to Zen and Buddhism. It may also include irrational movements whose original meaning have been lost even to those who are masters of the school, or movements added for aesthetic reasons during the peaceful Edo period.

The system of kobudō is considered in following priorities order: 1) morals, 2) discipline 3) aesthetic form.

Okinawan kobudō
Kobudō can also be used to refer to Okinawan kobudō where it describes collectively all Okinawan combative systems.  These are entirely different and basically unrelated systems. The use of the term kobudō should not be limited, as it popularly is, to the describing of the ancient weapons systems of Okinawa.

Examples of taught skills 

 Bōjutsu
 Jujutsu
 Jittejutsu
 Kenjutsu
 Kyūjutsu
 Naginatajutsu
 Ōzutsu (大筒) hand cannon
 Sōjutsu
 Tantojutsu
 Yabusame

See also
List of koryū schools of martial arts

Sources
 Draeger, Donn F. Classical Bujitsu (Martial Arts and Ways of Japan). Weatherhill, 1973, 2007.  
 Hall, David A. Encyclopedia of Japanese Martial Arts. Kodansha USA, 2012. 
 Skoss, Diane, Editor. Koryu Bujutsu: Classical Warrior Traditions of Japan. Koryubooks, 1997. 
 Skoss, Diane, Editor. Sword and Spirit: Classical Warrior Traditions of Japan, Volume 2. Koryubooks, 1999. 
 Skoss, Diane, Editor. Keiko Shokon: Classical Warrior Traditions of Japan, Volume 3. Koryubooks, 2002.

References

External links
 Nihon Kobudō Kyokai Official Kobudō website (in Japanese)
 What is Koryu?
 Koryu.com in English. Provides articles and links to books. 
 KoryuWeb in French and English.

Japanese martial arts
Japanese martial arts terminology
 

ja:古武道